Night in May is a 1934 German comedy film directed by Henri Chomette, Gustav Ucicky and Raoul Ploquin. It starred Käthe von Nagy, Fernand Gravey and Annie Ducaux. It is the French-language version of UFA's The Young Baron Neuhaus. Such multi-language versions were common during the early years of sound film before dubbing had become more widespread.

The film's sets were designed by the art directors Robert Herlth and Walter Röhrig.

Plot
Baron Neuhaus obtains the responsibility of the police at the court of Maria Theresa. He is tasked with searching for a man who smuggled into the home of Countess Christel. But it is actually about himself, who came to thank the Countess's maid.

Cast
Käthe von Nagy as Countess Christel Palm
Fernand Gravey as Baron Neuhaus
Annie Ducaux as Empress Marie-Thérèse
Monette Dinay as Toni
Lucien Baroux as Monsieur Stockel
Marguerite Templey as Madame Stockel
Katia Lova as Josefa
Alexandre Rignault as Gaysberger
Lucien Dayle as Leiner
Georges Morton as judge
Raoul Marco as sergeant
Raymond Aimos as Stumm
Jean Bara
Lilian Claude Barghon as the little girl
Jeanne de Carol
Henri Chomette
Dina Cocea
Eugène Dumas
Fernand Frey
Micheline Masson
Pierre Piérade
Philippe Richard
Sinoël

References

External links

1930s historical comedy films
German historical comedy films
Films of Nazi Germany
Films directed by Henri Chomette
Films directed by Gustav Ucicky
Films directed by Raoul Ploquin
UFA GmbH films
Films set in the 18th century
German multilingual films
German black-and-white films
1934 multilingual films
1934 comedy films
1930s German films